Basellandschaftliche Kantonalbank is a Swiss cantonal bank which is part of the 24 cantonal banks serving Switzerland's 26 cantons.  Founded in 1864, Basellandschaftliche Kantonalbank in 2014 had 23 branches across Switzerland with 636 employees; total assets of the bank were 21 759.16 mln CHF. Basellandschaftliche Kantonalbank has full state guarantee of its liabilities.

Notes and references

See also 

 Cantonal bank
 List of banks in Switzerland

External links 
 
 

Cantonal banks
Companies listed on the SIX Swiss Exchange